Richard Burnett is a columnist and editor of Montreal's alternative newsweekly Hour.

Richard Burnett may also refer to:

Dick Burnett (musician) (1883–1977), fiddler and composer
Dick Burnett (baseball), former owner of the Dallas Rangers baseball team
Richie Burnett (born 1967), Welsh darts player
Rick Burnett (musician), in Grinderswitch
Rick Burnett, presenter on Australian TV series Extra
Richard Compton-Burnett (born 1961), English cricketer